Madewood Plantation House, also known as Madewood, is a former sugarcane plantation house on Bayou Lafourche, near Napoleonville, Louisiana. It is located approximately two miles east of Napoleonville on Louisiana Highway 308.  A National Historic Landmark, the 1846 house is architecturally significant as the first major work of Henry Howard, and as one of the finest Greek Revival plantation houses in the American South.

Description
The Madewood Plantation House is located on the northern bank of Bayou Lafourche, on manicured grounds separated from the bayou by Highway 308.  It is a two-story masonry structure, built with massive brick walls that have been finished with stucco scored to resemble stone blocks.  Its five-bay facade is fronted by a six-column Greek Revival temple front, that has Ionic columns rising to a broad entablature and fully pedimented gable with a half-round louver at the center.  The second-level gallery has a delicate carved balustrade.  The main block is flanked on the right by a rectangular ell, and the left by an L-shaped one that extends beyond the rear of the main block.  The interior exhibits high quality woodwork, mostly cypress, with some of it painted to resemble other materials, such as marble, oak, and other exotic woods.

History

The mansion was built for Colonel Thomas Pugh in 1846 and was designed by architect Henry Howard in Greek Revival style. The house was originally the manor house for a  sugar plantation.

Thomas Pugh was the half brother of William Whitmell Hill Pugh who owned the Woodlawn plantation and Alexander Franklin Pugh who was part owner of the Augustin, Bellevue, Boatner, and New Hope plantations. Thomas Pugh died of yellow fever in 1852. During the Civil War, the lawns were used by Union troops as a hospital.

The Madewood house was purchased by Harold Marshall in 1964 and underwent major restoration that was completed in 1978. It was declared a National Historic Landmark in 1983.

Today it is run as a tourist attraction and a bed and breakfast.

In popular culture
The plantation has been featured in several film and television productions, including A Woman Called Moses (1978), Sister, Sister (1987), and The Beguiled (2017).

Portions of Beyonce's visual album Lemonade (2016) were filmed at the location.

The music video for J. Cole's "G.O.M.D." (2015) was filmed at the plantation.

See also
National Register of Historic Places listings in Assumption Parish, Louisiana
List of National Historic Landmarks in Louisiana

References

External links
 Madewood Plantation House (official site)

National Historic Landmarks in Louisiana
Houses in Assumption Parish, Louisiana
Houses completed in 1845
Sugar plantations in Louisiana
Tourist attractions in Assumption Parish, Louisiana
Hotels in Louisiana
Plantation houses in Louisiana
National Register of Historic Places in Assumption Parish, Louisiana